Nenzel Hill is a summit in the U.S. state of Nevada.

Nenzel Hill was named after Joseph F. Nenzel, a businessperson in the local mining industry.

References

Mountains of Pershing County, Nevada